Ubiquitin C-terminal hydrolase may refer to:
 Ubiquitin carboxy-terminal hydrolase L1, an enzyme
 Ubiquitinyl hydrolase 1, an enzyme